Kuntur Amaya (Aymara kunturi condor, amaya dead body, dead / beloved son / battlement / a thin person / lazy, Hispanicized spellings Condor Amaya, Cóndor Amaya) is an archaeological site in Bolivia. It is located in the La Paz Department, Aroma Province, Umala Municipality, near Wayllani and Kuntur Amaya. The site was declared a National Monument on December 12, 2006. It is a place with burial towers (chullpa).

References 

 lostiempos.com Satellite photo shown in Los Tiempos

Archaeological sites in Bolivia
Tombs in Bolivia
La Paz Department (Bolivia)